Dromin/Athlacca is a Gaelic Athletic Association club located in Athlacca, County Limerick, Ireland. The club fields teams in both hurling and Gaelic football.

History

Hurling in the locality dates back to 1887 when a Dromin team fielded a team in one of the first tournaments organised under GAA rules. The club has enjoyed multiple county championship successes in the 21st century, having claimed four County Intermediate Championship titles.

Honours

Limerick Intermediate Hurling Championship: 1977, 2004, 2007, 2013, 2018
Limerick Junior Hurling Championship: 1995

Notable players

David Reidy

References

Gaelic games clubs in County Limerick
Gaelic football clubs in County Limerick
Hurling clubs in County Limerick